Young Woodley may refer to: 

 Young Woodley (play), a 1925 British play by John Van Druten
 Young Woodley (1928 film), a silent film adaptation, never released 
 Young Woodley (1930 film), a 1930 sound film adaptation by Thomas Bentley